Torquato Tasso is a melodramma semiserio, or "semi-serious" opera, in three acts by Gaetano Donizetti and based on the life of the great poet Torquato Tasso. The Italian libretto was written by Jacopo Ferretti, who used a number of sources for his text, including works by Giovanni Rosini, Goethe, Goldoni and Lord Byron, as well as Tasso's actual poetry.  It premiered on 9 September 1833 at the Teatro Valle, Rome.

The work has been criticized for "its odd deployment of vocal types" characteristic of the semiseria genre.

Roles

Synopsis
Time: 16th century
Place: Ferrara, Northern Italy

Recordings

References
Notes

Cited sources
Ashbrook, William  (1998), "Torquato Tasso, in Stanley Sadie  (Ed.), The New Grove Dictionary of Opera, Vol. One. London: Macmillan Publishers, Inc.   
Osborne, Charles, (1994),  The Bel Canto Operas of Rossini, Donizetti, and Bellini,  Portland, Oregon: Amadeus Press. 

Other sources
Allitt, John Stewart (1991), Donizetti: in the light of Romanticism and the teaching of Johann Simon Mayr, Shaftesbury: Element Books, Ltd (UK); Rockport, MA: Element, Inc.(USA)
Ashbrook, William (1982), Donizetti and His Operas, Cambridge University Press.  
Ashbrook, William and Sarah Hibberd (2001), in  Holden, Amanda (Ed.), The New Penguin Opera Guide, New York: Penguin Putnam. .  pp. 224 – 247.
Black, John (1982), Donizetti’s Operas in Naples, 1822—1848. London: The Donizetti Society.
Loewenberg, Alfred (1970). Annals of Opera, 1597-1940, 2nd edition.  Rowman and Littlefield
Sadie, Stanley, (Ed.); John Tyrell (Exec. Ed.) (2004), The New Grove Dictionary of Music and Musicians.  2nd edition. London: Macmillan.    (hardcover).   (eBook).
 Weinstock, Herbert (1963), Donizetti and the World of Opera in Italy, Paris, and Vienna in the First Half of the Nineteenth Century, New York: Pantheon Books.

External links
  Donizetti Society (London) website
 Libretto Italian

Italian-language operas
Operas by Gaetano Donizetti
Opera semiseria
Operas
1833 operas
Torquato Tasso
Operas set in Italy
Cultural depictions of writers
Cultural depictions of Italian men